Shannon Rusbuldt (born February 14, 1985) is an American model.

Modeling career
Rusbuldt is an editorial and runway model based in Los Angeles. Soon after moving to New York from Alexandria, Virginia, she was offered a contract from Elite Model Management that launched her fashion career. Rusbuldt has walked the runway for designers such as Giorgio Armani, Tommy Hilfiger, Tory Burch, Sophie Theallet. She has appeared in magazines such asVogue, Elle, Cosmopolitan, Zink, Fitness and InStyle. 

Rusbuldt plays the water goddess of death in The History Channel's series, Vikings.

Charity work
Rusbuldt works with the charities Project Sunshine, Fashion Delivers, and the National MS Society. Currently, she is spearheading a large-scale fashion charity event in October for the National MS Society in Washington, DC.

References

External links
 
 Online.wsj.com

1985 births
Living people
American female models
21st-century American women